Nikita Aleksandrovich Karmayev (born 17 July 2000) is a Russian football player who plays for FC Rotor Volgograd on loan from FC Akhmat Grozny.

Club career
He made his debut in the Russian Premier League for FC Akhmat Grozny on 27 September 2020 in a game against FC Ural Yekaterinburg.

References

External links
 
 
 

2000 births
Sportspeople from Krasnodar Krai
People from Slavyansk-na-Kubani
Living people
Russian footballers
Russia under-21 international footballers
Association football defenders
FC Akhmat Grozny players
Russian Premier League players
FC Urozhay Krasnodar players
FC Rotor Volgograd players